"Shia LaBeouf" is a 2012 song by singer-songwriter Rob Cantor that portrays Hollywood actor Shia LaBeouf as a hermit cannibal.  In 2014, Cantor released an expanded music video with a cameo from LaBeouf himself.

Development

After a friend began "dramatically whispering" the name of actor Shia LaBeouf, Los Angeles-based singer-songwriter Rob Cantor wrote "Shia LaBeouf" in 2011, inspired by "nothing but the sheer silliness of imagining Shia LaBeouf, face and clothes smeared with half-dried blood, terrorizing helpless victims in a dark wood."  The song describes an encounter and battle with LaBeouf, portrayed as an "actual cannibal" who lives in a forest and hunts people for sport.  After writing the song, Cantor had hoped Funny or Die would be interested in using it in a video featuring the actor, but that arrangement never materialized.

In 2012, Cantor posted "Shia LaBeouf" to his SoundCloud page, from where one of his fans found and shared it on Twitter.

Music video

On October 21, 2014, Cantor released a music video for an extended version of "Shia LaBeouf", in which he and an ensemble of artists perform the song on stage.  LaBeouf makes a cameo at the end as the only audience member, and gives them a standing ovation.  The stage performance took four months to plan and one day to film.

The Los Angeles Times reported that the video—filmed at the Redondo Beach Performing Arts Center—was inspired by then-contemporary incidents where LaBeouf had behaved strangely in public, however Cantor later told MTV that he just felt that "Halloween was the right time" to fulfill his dream of making the video.

Of the juxtaposition of 3D papercraft LaBeouf heads (which took 80 man-hours to assemble), professional performers in classical arts, and his absurd song about a cannibalistic Hollywood star, Cantor called the production bathos.

Personnel
For this work, Cantor recruited 161 further artists, including the Argus Quartet, the West Los Angeles Children's Choir, the Gay Men's Chorus of Los Angeles, interpretive dancers, and stage effects by Kinetic Theory Theater.  Stacy Tookey choreographed the dancing troupe in the short film; she and her dancers were only able to begin rehearsing three days before the shoot.  The aerialists were brought onboard with only two days before filming.

Cantor already knew LaBeouf was aware of the original song because the actor had tweeted the link on Halloween 2013.  The songwriter contacted the actor's talent manager and laid out his plan for LaBeouf to be the only audience member for the production; LaBeouf agreed to the proposition in less than two days.

Production
For the expanded version of the song, Greg Nicolett wrote the symphonic arrangement.  He convinced Cantor to reduce a planned 50-piece orchestra to a string quartet not only for reduced costs, but the latter would increase the pretentiousness and therefore the absurdity in comparison to the subject matter.  Scott Uhlfelder, a friend of Cantor's, served as the video's director and cinematographer.

The Redondo Beach Performing Arts Center was "the nicest theater [Cantor] could afford", and artists began arriving at 6a.m.  The entire music video was never shot as one continuous performance, but was instead broken up into segments, the first of which began at 9a.m. for cameras.  LaBeouf's cameo was the last part filmed.

When the production team continued "having more good ideas that we wanted to bring to fruition" like the aerialists and LaBeouf himself, Cantor provided the remaining .

References

External links
 
 

2012 songs
cultural depictions of actors
cultural depictions of American men
songs about actors
songs about cannibalism